Queen's County Council (now Laois County Council) was created in 1899 under the Local Government (Ireland) Act 1898 and  the first local elections for the county council, and the councils of the five rural districts within Queen's County, were held on 6 April 1899, simultaneous with elections in the other administrative counties. The first Queen's County Council comprised 32 councillors serving a three-year term:
 22 elected, one from each of the 22 county districts
 five rural district council chairmen, ex officio
 three nominees of the outgoing county grand jury, the unelected county government prior to the 1898 act
 two members co-opted by the other members at the council's first meeting on 22 April 1899

Councillors

Results by district

References
 

County Queens
1899